Okpe may refer to:

Okpe language (Northwestern Edo)
Okpe language (Southwestern Edo)